Saint Mary's Cemetery may refer to:

United States

 Saint Mary Cemetery (Oakland, California)
 St. Mary's Cemetery, part of Putnam Cemetery, Greenwich, Connecticut
 Saint Mary's Cemetery (Maryland), in Rockville, Maryland
 Saint Mary's Cemetery (Newton Lower Falls, Massachusetts)
 Saint Mary Cemetery, a cemetery in Omaha, Nebraska
 St. Mary's Cemetery, East Orange, a cemetery in New Jersey
 Saint Mary's Cemetery, Hackensack, a cemetery in New Jersey
 St. Mary's Cemetery (Lawrence County, Tennessee)
 Saint Mary's Catholic Cemetery, Norfolk, Virginia

Other places
 St. Marys Cemetery, St. Marys, Ontario, Canada
 St. Mary's Cemetery, Wandsworth, Wandsworth, London, UK
 St. Mary's Roman Catholic Cemetery, Kensal Green, London, UK